The Paradise Tour was Cody Simpson's 2013–2014 tour.

Opening acts
Ryan Beatty (30 May-20 July 2013)
Before You Exit (30 May-20 July 2013, select shows)
Plug in Stereo (10-31 January 2014)

Setlist
The following songs were performed at the 4 June 2013 concert at Club Nokia in Los Angeles. It does not represent all shows during the tour
"Be the One"
"Paradise"
"La Da Dee"
"No Ceiling"
"Wish U Were Here"
"Awake All Night"
"Hallelujah"
"Summertime of Our Lives"
"Good as It Gets"
"Round of Applause"
"On My Mind"
"All Day"
"Angel"
"Summer Shade"
"Gentleman"
"Don't Cry Your Heart Out"
"Love"
"Back to You"
"Not Just You"
"Tears On Your Pillow
"Got Me Good"
"If You Left Him For Me"
"Pretty Brown Eyes"
Encore
"Be the One"
"iYiYi"

Tour dates

Festivals and other miscellaneous performances
Real.Fun.BeachFest
Summerfest

Cancellations and rescheduled shows

External links
Cody Simpson Website

References

2013 concert tours
2014 concert tours
Cody Simpson concert tours